The Bank Raiders is a 1958 British crime film directed by Maxwell Munden and starring Peter Reynolds, Sandra Dorne and Lloyd Lamble.

Plot
Terry, a small-time hoodlum, is the driver in a successful bank robbery. He gets his share of the loot and is told to lie low. Instead, he goes on the town with Della, a gorgeous, but greedy, party girl. Terry is questioned and released by police. Bernie Shelton, the gang boss, kidnaps the only witness. Then he sends his goon (Linders) to kill Terry, but Linders gets shot instead. With police after him, Terry seeks shelter in Della's apartment. When Della learns that Shelton, a man who spurned her, was behind the raid, she promises to run away with Terry, if he'll confront his boss at gun-point to get the rest of the loot

Cast
 Peter Reynolds as Terry Milligan
 Sandra Dorne as Della Byrne
 Sydney Tafler as Bernie Shelton
 Lloyd Lamble as Detective Inspector Mason
 Rose Hill as Landlady
 Arthur Mullard as Linders
 Tim Ellison as Jack Conner
 Ann King as Ann Seaton
 Robert Bruce as Det. Sgt. Bates
 Jeanne Kent as Mrs Conner
 Roberta Woolley as Sonia Conner

Critical reception
Radio Times called it "A dismal B-movie...Designed as something to have on the screen while the queue was being let in to the cinema, it's cheap and cheerless wallpaper, though connoisseurs of early TV sitcoms might relish the sight of heavyweight Arthur Mullard, who usually turned in performances as the village idiot"; while Allmovie wrote, "Bank Raiders delivers value for money in its brief 60-minute time span."

References

External links
 

1958 films
British crime films
1958 crime films
1950s English-language films
1950s British films